Warrior Soul is an American rock band, formed by lead singer and producer Kory Clarke. Clarke started the band on a bet from a promoter at New York City's Pyramid Club, after a solo performance art show called "Kory Clarke/Warrior Soul". Clarke was determined he would have the best band in the city within six months. Nine months later he signed a multi-album deal with Geffen Records.

History
Kory Clarke originally started in the music scene as a drummer for several bands, including Detroit punks L-Seven (not to be confused with the all-female Los Angeles band L7), Pennsylvania Southern rockers Raging Slab, and a Kim Fowley project called "The Trial". After moving to New York City, Clarke did one-man performance art shows. Although believing rock bands to be less artistic, he was persuaded to reform a band, which he named Warrior Soul after a line in a George S. Patton docudrama.

The band began to play in New York City in 1987, and soon came to the attention of Geffen, who signed the band. Geffen directed Clarke to shed his hired band and get new players. Clarke insisted on keeping Pete McClanahan as his bass player, and recruited guitarist John Ricco and former Killing Joke drummer Paul Ferguson.

In 1990, Warrior Soul released their first album, Last Decade Dead Century. AllMusic reviewer Eduardo Rivadavia compared it to Nirvana's Nevermind, saying that although comparable success eluded Warrior Soul, it explored similar themes.  Rivadavia speculated that the nihilism of Nevermind may have resonated more with Generation X.

1991 saw Ferguson replaced on drums by Mark Evans, and the band's second album Drugs, God and the New Republic released, which took their anarchist leanings even further. A nationwide support tour with Queensrÿche (with whom they shared management from the Q Prime agency) followed.

The following year saw the release of the band's third album, 1992's Salutations from the Ghetto Nation, and Clarke's relationship with Geffen sour. Clarke's interviews became increasingly bitter, often focusing on the band's record label, whom he accused of ignoring the group's potential. Eventually, Clarke resorted to an all-out war, telling all that the band's fourth release, 1993's Chill Pill had been botched on purpose in order to fulfill the band's contract. The ploy seemed to work, and by early 1994 Warrior Soul were dropped by Geffen.

A number of lineup changes ensued. Longtime guitarist John Ricco was ousted, replaced by two guitarists:  Alexander Arundel (aka X-Factor aka Gene Poole ) and Chris Moffet (former Cycle Sluts from Hell lead guitarist). Not long after, Mark Evans and Chris Moffet departed. At that time former Nuclear Assault/Cities/Cycle Sluts from Hell drummer Scott Duboys joined the band. The line-up now consisted of Clarke, Arundel, McClanahan and Duboys. Clarke sought to reinvent Warrior Soul as self-appointed cyberpunks for their fifth album, 1994's The Space Age Playboys, released on the independent Futurist label. At this time adding old friend and collaborator, Peter Jay on rhythm guitar. While touring in support of the album, Warrior Soul headlined the 1995 Kerrang! UK tour, as well as performing at the 1995 Dynamo Open Air Festival, and also at the 1995 Donnington Monsters of Rock concert.

After the performance of their last live show in September 1995, Arundel, Duboys, and longtime bassist McClanahan quit the band, leading in short order to Clarke's decision to retire the band later that year.

In 1996, Odds & Ends was released as a collection of demos recorded on an eight-track with Arundel, and leftover material that was originally intended for release on Elektra Records.

The "classic" lineup of Clarke, Ricco, McClanahan, and Evans later reunited for a short tour and to go in the studio to re-record twelve of the bands' songs, released on Dream Catcher Records as Classics in 2000.  All Warrior Soul albums were remastered and re-released on CD and MP3 in 2006 and 2009, including with bonus material (mostly live songs originally released as b-sides).  The first three albums were also re-released on vinyl in 2009.

Clarke says many of their songs are politically based, such as "Blown Away", "Superpower Dreamland", "In Conclusion", and "Children of the Winter". Clarke describes the band's sound as "acid punk", particularly their The Space Age Playboys album.

Drummer Mark Evans was murdered in London, England, in 2005.

Reformation
In 2007 Clarke revived the name, and has been recording and touring with an ever-changing cast of musicians under the "Warrior Soul" name ever since.

Initially setting out on a tour of the UK, a live album soon followed. 2008 saw the band released a new studio album, initially titled Chinese Democracy (as a dig at the long-delayed Guns N' Roses release), but quickly renamed Destroy the War Machine.

In 2012, another new lineup released the studio album Stiff Middle Finger co-produced by Sue Gere and Kory Clarke, with Lundell still on guitar but joined by "Johnny H" and Xevi "Strings" Abellán, Danny Engstrom and Sue Gere on bass and drums by Freddie Cocker Kvarnebrink.  Former band member John Ricco makes a guest appearance on guitar, as does The Mission guitarist Mark Gemini Thwaite.  The band embarked on a month-long European tour in November 2012, followed by a brief tour through the Eastern United States in December. Original bass player Pete McClanahan joined the live lineup for a few months in 2013. Christian Kimmett joined the band on bass in 2013 after McClanahan's departure, and Stevie Pearce joined on guitar a year later. This lineup undertook extensive touring of Europe and the US over the next three years and released a live album, Tough As Fuck in 2016. 2017 saw the release of a new studio album - Back On The Lash - with yet another new lineup, including the rhythm section from Urge Overkill, Adam and Nate Arling, joined by guitarist John 'Full Throttle' Polachek.

In 2014 Clarke brought out a solo album recorded in Porto, Portugal Payback's A Bitch. Co Producer Andre Indiana and Monica Ferraz on backing vocals make this album very unusual and diverse demonstrating the different sides to Clarke's musical abilities. Rolling Stone Germany gave the album full score.

Musical style
Eduardo Rivadavia of AllMusic described the band as a "kinetic art rock quartet" and as "an outspoken hard rock outfit", whose "incendiary mix of anarchic art-rock and alternative heavy metal earned them a multi-album deal with Geffen Records".

Band members

Current members 

 Kory Clarke (vocals)
 Adam Arling (bass)
 John "Full Throttle" Polachek (guitar)
 Nate Arling (drums)

Former members 

 Pete McClanahan (bass)
 Dennis Post (guitar)
 John Ricco (guitar)
 Paul Ferguson (drums)
 Mark Evans (drums)
 Alexander "X-Factor" Arundel (guitar)
 Miguel Martins (guitar)
 Chris Moffet (guitar)
 Scott Duboys (drums)
 Mike McNamara (bass)
 Peter Jay (guitar)
 Rille Lundell (guitar)
 Rob "Stevo" Stephenson (drums)
 Janne Jarvis (bass)
 Johnny H (guitar)
 Daniel "Danny" Engstrom (bass)
 Sue Gere (bass)
 Xevi "Strings" Abellán (guitar)
 Johan Lindström (drums)
 Christian Kimmett (bass)
 Hector D (drums)

Discography

Albums
(1990) Last Decade Dead Century
(1991) Drugs, God and the New Republic
(1992) Salutations from the Ghetto Nation
(1993) Chill Pill
(1994)  The Space Age Playboys
(1996) Odds & Ends (also released under the title Fucker in Europe.)
(2000) Classics
(2008) Live in England
(2009) Destroy the War Machine (originally released as Chinese Democracy, also released as ...And We Rock and Roll!)
(2012) Stiff Middle Finger
(2016) Tough as Fuck: Live in Athens
(2017) Back on the Lash
(2019) Rock 'N' Roll Disease
(2020) Cocaine And Other Good Stuff
(2022) Out on Bail

Singles
(1990) "We Cry Out":  1. "We Cry Out" (LP Version)
(1990) "The Losers"
(1991) "Hero" : 1. "Hero" (LP version) 2. "Twenty Four Hours" (previously unreleased) 3. "Ghetto Nation" (Different from released version)
(1991) "The Wasteland" : 1. "The Wasteland" (Censored Version) 2. "The Wasteland" (LP Version)
(1992) "Ghetto Nation" : 1. "Ghetto Nation" (album version) 2. "Intro" (live) 3. "Love Destruction" (live) 4. "Blown" (live)
(1992) "Love Destruction"
(1995) "Space Age Singles" : 1. "The Drug" (edit) 2. "I Wanna Get Some" (edit) 3. "The Drug" (album version) 4. "I Wanna Get Some" (album version)

References

External links
 Warrior Soul Myspace page
 Warrior Soul Facebook page
 Audio Interview with Warrior Soul at Hard Rock Hell Festival 2008

Heavy metal musical groups from New York (state)
Hard rock musical groups from New York (state)
American alternative metal musical groups
American art rock groups
Musical groups established in 1987